Scott Melton (born November 30, 1961) is an American professional stock car racing driver. He competes part-time in the ARCA Menards Series, driving the No. 69 Ford Mustang for Kimmel Racing.

Racing career

ARCA Menards Series 
Melton would begin racing in 2018, driving 4 Cylinder races at Springport Speedway. He decided to race in the ARCA Menards Series, after having talks with Bill Kimmel, the owner of Kimmel Racing. He finished 15th in his first start at Berlin Raceway, and followed with a 25th-place finish at the Lucas Oil Indianapolis Raceway Park. He would run half of the season in 2019, earning two top tens, with his best career finish being 9th at Michigan International Speedway, and finishing 15th in the point standings. 2020 would be his breakout season, earning three top tens, with his best finish of 9th at Kansas Speedway.  He would follow with a 10th-place finish at Talladega Superspeedway in 2021. Melton suffered a compound fracture in his left leg in an accident at the 2022 General Tire 200. However, according to a pit box, he will return at Pocono.

Personal life 
Melton was born and raised in Rockford, Michigan, and has eight children. He currently operates the Melton-McFadden Insurance Agency, an insurance company located in Greenville and Belding, Michigan, and would often sponsor all of his races.

Motorsports career results

ARCA Menards Series 
(key) (Bold – Pole position awarded by qualifying time. Italics – Pole position earned by points standings or practice time. * – Most laps led.)

References

External links 
 Official website

 

1961 births
Living people
ARCA Menards Series drivers
NASCAR drivers
Racing drivers from Michigan